Cerretto Langhe, also Cerreto Langhe, is a comune (municipality) in the Province of Cuneo in the Italian region Piedmont, located about  southeast of Turin and about  northeast of Cuneo.

Cerreto Langhe borders the following municipalities: Albaretto della Torre, Arguello, Cravanzana, Feisoglio, Roddino, Serravalle Langhe, and Sinio.

Demographic evolution

References

Cities and towns in Piedmont